Gnanamuttu Krishnapillai (alias Vellimalai) is a Sri Lankan Tamil politician, provincial councillor and former Member of Sri Lankan Parliament.

Krishnapillai contested the 2001 parliamentary election as one of the Tamil National Alliance's candidates in Batticaloa District and was elected to Parliament. He contested the 2012 provincial council election as one of the TNA's candidates in Batticaloa District and was elected to the Eastern Provincial Council (EPC). A few days after the election some TNA councillors including Krishnapillai were threatened and coerced into joining the United People's Freedom Alliance but none of them gave in to the threats. Krishnapillai and the other newly elected TNA provincial councillors took their oaths on 28 September 2012 in front of TNA leader and Member of Parliament R. Sampanthan.

References

All Ceylon Tamil Congress politicians
Living people
Members of the 12th Parliament of Sri Lanka
Members of the Eastern Provincial Council
People from Eastern Province, Sri Lanka
Sri Lankan Tamil politicians
Tamil National Alliance politicians
Tamil United Liberation Front politicians
Year of birth missing (living people)